The following is a list of lakes and reservoirs in Jingzhou Miao and Dong Autonomous County, Hunan, China.

List

References

External links
   

Lakes